Dr. Yashwant Singh Parmar University of Horticulture and Forestry (YSP UHF), known by the abbreviation Dr. Y. S. Parmar University of Horticulture and Forestry, is a state university located in district Solan, Himachal Pradesh, India. It has exclusive mandate of education, research and extension in horticulture and forestry.

History
The Himachal Agricultural College, Solan was established in 1962 and affiliated to the Panjab University.Dr. S.S.Jain, Mycologist & Plant Pathologist was the Officer on Special duty appointed by the HP State Government Department of Agriculture to set it up. In 1970 the Himachal Pradesh University was established and the college became one of its campuses. In 1978 it became the horticulture complex of the recently established Himachal Pradesh Krishi Vishvavidyalaya. Finally, on 1 December 1985 it was upgraded to a State University and named after Yashwant Singh Parmar, the first Chief Minister of Himachal Pradesh. It was inaugurated on 30 April 1988 by the late Rajiv Gandhi, Prime Minister of India.

Academics

It offers undergraduate, postgraduate and doctoral courses in horticulture, forestry and allied disciplines.

Dr. Y S Parmar University of Horticulture and Forestry has six colleges: the College of Horticulture, the College of Forestry, and the College of Horticulture and Forestry Neri, India (Hamirpur), College of Horticulture and Forestry Thunag (Mandi, Himachal Pradesh) which are subdivided into 14 departments and are looked after by a faculty of over 500 scientists and teachers. It has a school specialized in the study of apples, called Apple School, Nauni. The department of management is under the college of horticulture providing degree in three basic courses: Marketing, Finance, and Human Resources with agribusiness.

References

External links
 

Forestry education in India
Horticultural organisations based in India
Agricultural universities and colleges in India
Universities in Himachal Pradesh
Agriculture in Himachal Pradesh
Education in Solan district
Educational institutions established in 1985
1985 establishments in Himachal Pradesh